Princess Protection Program is a 2009 Disney Channel Original Movie, directed by Allison Liddi-Brown and starring Demi Lovato and Selena Gomez. The script was written by Annie DeYoung from a story by Annie DeYoung and David Morgasen. The film premiered on June 26, 2009 in the United States on Disney Channel and was released on DVD on June 30, 2009. The film won the 2009 Teen Choice Awards for Choice Summer Movie.

Plot 

Princess Rosalinda María Montoya Fioré is about to be crowned queen of the small nation of Costa Luna. General Magnus Kane, the dictator of neighboring country, Costa Estrella, invades her palace with his agents during her coronation rehearsal, and attempts to capture the royal family and take over the country. Major Joe Mason, an agent of the Princess Protection Program (P.P.P.), a secret organization funded by royal families that looks after endangered princesses, whisks her away to safety via helicopter. Kane's agents, however, succeed in capturing her widowed mother, Queen Sofía Fioré of Costa Luna.

The Princess Protection Program hides Rosalinda in Joe's home in Lake Monroe, Louisiana, where she meets his teenage daughter, Carter Mason. Carter is an insecure tomboy who works at the family bait shop and dreams of going to the homecoming dance with her crush, Donny, although her classmate, Ed, secretly has a crush on her. Rosalinda poses as "Rosie Gonzalez", Carter's cousin from Iowa. Though Carter initially treats her with hostility, she warms up to her after Rosie explains her situation, and the two become best friends. Carter teaches Rosie to act like the average American teenager, and Rosie shows Carter how to disarm those that scorn them, especially resident mean girls, Chelsea Barnes  and Brooke Angels. Rosie soon becomes popular at their high school.

In an attempt to trick Rosalinda into exposing her location, General Kane announces plans to forcibly marry her mother. Brooke discovers the truth about Rosie and threatens to expose her unless Rosie drops out of the vote for Homecoming Queen. Rosie reads of the pending nuptials in the magazine and tells Carter that she has decided to return home. Knowing Costa Luna is still too dangerous, Carter secretly devises a plan to pose as Rosalinda and use herself as bait to lure Kane into capture. Carter calls Mr. Elegante, Rosalinda's royal dressmaker and friend, for help with her plan. He tells Kane that Rosalinda will be attending the homecoming dance and plans to wear a Caribbean blue dress – he actually sends it to Carter, and gives Rosie a pale pink one. In the meantime, Rosie agrees to stay for the dance.

In order to help make the event special, a group of friends, including Rosie and Carter, wear masks to the dance, helping Carter disguise herself as Rosalinda. According to plan, Kane and his agents mistake Carter for Rosalinda and lead her to Kane's helicopter. However, after winning the Homecoming Queen title despite Chelsea and Brooke's efforts, Rosie discovers and ruins the plan by exposing herself to Kane, insisting to Carter that it is not her fight. Luckily, agents of the Princess Protection Program, including Major Mason, have been waiting inside the helicopter and rescue both girls. The P.P.P. agents quickly apprehend Kane and his henchmen and turn them over to the international authorities. Rosie is crowned Queen Rosalinda of Costa Luna with Carter, Joe, Ed, Sofía, and Mr. Elegante in attendance.

In the extended ending, one year later, Rosie and Carter, who both became P.P.P. agents, are getting ready for their new assignment as they board a plane.

Cast
 Demi Lovato as Princess Rosalinda Maria Montoya Fiore/Rosie Gonzalez 
 Selena Gomez as Carter Mason
 Tom Verica as Major Joe Mason
 Sully Díaz as Queen Sofía Fiore
 Johnny Ray Rodríguez as General Magnus Kane
 Jamie Chung as Chelsea Barnes
 Nicholas Braun as Ed 
 Robert Adamson as Donny
 Samantha Droke as Brooke
 Kevin G. Schmidt as Bull
 Talia Rothenberg as Margaret
 Molly Hagan as The Director
 Dale Dickey as Helen Digenerstet
 Ricardo Álvarez as Mr. Elegante
 Brian Tester as Principal Burkle

Production
Filming took place in Puerto Rico from March 14, 2008 to April 18, 2008 and it is the first Disney Channel Original Movie filmed in Puerto Rico. School scenes as well as homecoming scenes were filmed at Colegio San Ignacio de Loyola and Colegio San José in San Juan and lake scenes were filmed at the Loíza Lake in Trujillo Alto. The Serralles Castle in Ponce was used for interior and exterior castle scenes while the interior courtyard of Casa de España in the Old San Juan was used for both coronation scenes.

Promotion
Disney Channel promoted the film's premiere weekend by offering never-before-seen episodes of their original series' Wizards of Waverly Place and Sonny with a Chance as an online reward if viewers could correctly count the number of times the words "princess," "princesses" and "princesa" are spoken during the film and enter the correct number into a section on their website.

Home media
The film was released on DVD on June 30, 2009, in the United States and was later available worldwide.

Music
The film introduced two songs: a duet recorded by Lovato and Gomez called "One and the Same" and a song recorded by Mitchel Musso called "The Girl Can't Help It". Both songs were included on the compilation album Disney Channel Playlist, which was released on June 9, 2009. The film also includes the song "Two Worlds Collide" by Lovato (featured on Lovato's debut album Don't Forget), "Saturdays and Sundays" by KSM (featured on their album Read Between the Lines) and "Ride" by Diana Page.

One and the Same

"One and the Same" is a song performed by the main actors Lovato and Gomez. The song was written by Vitamin C, Michael Kotch and Dave Derby and was produced by Mitch Allan. The song's music video was included on the DVD of the film. The song was also featured on the compilation album, Disney Channel Playlist, which was released on June 9, 2009.

Chart performance

The song peaked at number 82 on the US Billboard Hot 100. It has sold 336,000 digital copies, according to Nielsen SoundScan.

Charts

Reception 
On Rotten Tomatoes, the film has an approval rating of 60% based on 5 reviews. Laura Fries of Variety magazine describes the film as being "light as a summer breeze on the Louisiana bayou". Although the film does not stray far from the Disney formula, Fries also praised the film writer Annie DeYoung for providing young girls a nice message about self-esteem. Fries said the film should be a hit with the channel's target audience.

Ratings 
The film garnered 8.5 million viewers on its premiere, making Disney Channel the most-watched network in the time slot, with nearly double the viewers of CBS at that time.

Awards

References

External links 

 
 

2009 television films
2009 films
American buddy comedy films
American teen comedy films
Disney Channel Original Movie films
Films set in 2008
Films set in Louisiana
Films shot in Puerto Rico
Films about royalty
2000s buddy comedy films
2000s teen comedy films
American female buddy films
2000s female buddy films
Films set in a fictional country
Films set on fictional islands
Films about witness protection
Films about coups d'état
2000s American films